Scott 3 is the third solo album by singer songwriter Scott Walker.

Upon release in 1969, it met with slightly fewer sales than his previous albums, as pop audiences struggled to keep pace with Walker's increasingly experimental approach, though it still reached #3 on the UK Album Chart.  

The album's slightly muted reception and subsequent failure of his short-lived BBC TV series signified the beginning of Walker's decline in popularity. Since its release, however, it has been regarded by many of Walker's fans as a favourite. The title of the compilation Fire Escape in the Sky: The Godlike Genius of Scott Walker is taken from the lyrics of the song "Big Louise", and the 2006 documentary Scott Walker: 30 Century Man is named after "30 Century Man".

Marc Almond covered the song "Big Louise" in 1982 with his band Marc and the Mambas on the album Untitled.

In September 2019, Thom Yorke named "It's Raining Today" as one of the eight pieces of music he would take to an imaginary desert island in the BBC Radio 4 show Desert Island Discs.

Though a majority of the tracklist features original songs from Walker, the final three tracks are covers of compositions by Jacques Brel.

Track listing

The original U.S. Smash label vinyl issue omitted "30 Century Man", replacing it with "Lights of Cincinnati", a UK non-LP single from the same period. This issue also featured a different cover design from the UK Philips release.

Personnel
Scott Walker - vocals, arranger
Angela Morley - Arranged and conducted all songs except "30 Century Man" and "Funeral Tango"
Peter Knight - Arranged and conducted "Funeral Tango"

Release history

Charts

References

External links

Scott Walker (singer) albums
1969 albums
Albums conducted by Peter Knight (composer)
Albums arranged by Peter Knight (composer)
Albums produced by Johnny Franz
Philips Records albums
Fontana Records albums
Art pop albums